Puelmapu is the traditional Mapuche territory located east of the Andes. It covers much of Patagonia and the Pampas. Since the Conquest of the Desert (1878–1885) Puelmapu is part of Argentina. It is a theater of the Mapuche conflict.

References

Geography of Argentina
Mapuche regions
Historical regions
Huilliche